Dr. Zan Mitrev (11 January 1961) is a Macedonian cardiovascular surgeon and medical academic who has been serving, since 1999, as General Manager of the Filip Vtori Clinic special hospital for surgery, now renamed as "Zan Mitrev Clinic" special hospital for surgery in Skopje, the capital of North Macedonia.

References

1961 births
Living people
People from Štip
Macedonian surgeons
Macedonian academics
Medical academics
University of Zurich alumni